May 7: The almost completely deaf Beethoven premieres his  Ninth Symphony

Events

January–March 
 January 8 – After much controversy, Michael Faraday is finally elected as a member of the Royal Society, with only one vote against him.
 January 22 – First Anglo-Ashanti War: Battle of Nsamankow – forces of the Ashanti Empire crush British forces in the Gold Coast (modern-day Ghana), killing the British governor Sir Charles MacCarthy.
 January 24 – The first issue of the radical quarterly founded by Jeremy Bentham, The Westminster Review, is published in London.
 February 10 – Simón Bolívar is proclaimed dictator of Peru.
 February 21 – The Chumash Revolt of 1824 begins against the Spanish presence in California.
 March 4 – Founding of the Royal National Lifeboat Institution in the British Isles.
 March 5 – The First Anglo-Burmese War begins.
 March 7 – The Florida State Capitol moves from St. Augustine to Tallahassee.
 March 9 – Netherlands Trading Society (Netherlandsche Handel-Maatschappij), a predecessor of ABN AMRO, Dutch firm Financial group, founded.
 March 11 – The United States War Department creates the Bureau of Indian Affairs.
 March 17 – The Anglo-Dutch Treaty of 1824 is signed.
 March 19 – American explorer Benjamin Morrell departs Antarctica after a voyage later plagued by claims of fraud.
 March 29 – In Cairo, 4,000 people are killed in a fire, including people killed by the explosion of gunpowder housed at the palace of Egypt's Ottoman Governor Mehmet Ali.

April–June 
 April 9 – The first permanent settlers arrive to construct the new city of Tallahassee, Florida, selected to be the capital of the Florida Territory newly acquired from the Kingdom of Spain; the area has been selected because it is roughly equidistant from the territory's main cities, Pensacola and St. Augustine.
 April 19 – Lord Byron (George Gordon Byron), the British poet, dies at the age of 36 in the Greek city of Missolonghi, where he had taken ill while making plans to liberate the Greeks from Ottoman rule, "not in combat, but of a fever caught in the unhealthy conditions at Missolonghi... exacerbated, it is generally agreed, by the over-zealous actions of his doctors, who bled him excessively."
 May 7 – Beethoven's Symphony No. 9 (the "Choral") premieres at the Theater am Kärntnertor in Vienna. The deaf composer has to be turned around on the stage to witness the enthusiastic audience reaction.
 May 24 – First Anglo-Burmese War: The British take Rangoon, Burma.
 June 16 – The Royal Society for the Prevention of Cruelty to Animals is established in Great Britain.

July–September 
 July 2 – The Confederation of the Equator begins in Pernambuco, Brazil: Wealthy landowners against the government of Emperor Pedro I initiate a secessionist movement for the independence of Pernambuco.
 July 8 – Queen Kamāmalu of Hawaii dies of measles, while accompanying her husband during a visit to the United Kingdom.
 July 10 – Visit of the Marquis de Lafayette to the United States: Gilbert du Motier, Marquis de Lafayette and a beloved hero of the American Revolution, departs from the port of Le Havre in France on the ship Cadmus for a triumphant return to the United States; he arrives in New York on August 15.
 July 13 – King Kamehameha II of Hawaii dies of measles, during a visit to the United Kingdom, before he can meet with King George IV. Because of the slow communications of the era, news of the King's death does not reach Hawaii until the following March; his funeral will take place on May 11, 1825, and he will be succeeded by his brother Kamehameha III.
 July 19 – Don Agustín de Iturbide, who had formerly been President of Mexico and then proclaimed himself Emperor Agustin the First, until being overthrown on March 19, 1823, is executed by a firing squad in the city of Padilla, five days after returning from exile in England.
 July 25 – The Montparnasse Cemetery opens in Paris, France.
 August 6 – Peruvian War of Independence: Battle of Junín – Pro-independence forces defeat the Spanish in the highlands of the Junín region.
 August 7 – First Anglo-Ashanti War ends when forces of the Ashanti Empire flee the field.
 August 15 – Visit of the Marquis de Lafayette to the United States begins at Staten Island; he departs on September 7, 1825.
 September 13 – With his crew and 29 convicts aboard the Amity, John Oxley arrives at and founds the Moreton Bay Penal Settlement at what becomes Redcliffe City, Queensland, in Australia, after leaving Sydney.
 September 16 – Charles X succeeds his brother Louis XVIII as King of France.

October–December 
 October 4 – The First Constitution of Mexico is enacted, declaring the country to be a federal republic.
 October 10 – The Edinburgh Town Council founds the Edinburgh Municipal Fire Brigade, the first fire brigade in Britain, under the leadership of James Braidwood.
 October 21 – Joseph Aspdin patents Portland cement.
 November 5 – Rensselaer Polytechnic Institute, the first technological university in the English-speaking world, is founded in Troy, New York.
 November 30 – The first sod is turned in Ontario for the first of four Welland Canals (the canal opens for a trial run five years later to the day).
 December 3 – 1824 United States presidential election: None of the four candidates for U.S. president gain a majority of the electoral votes, so the election is thrown into the U.S. House of Representatives.
 December 9 – Battle of Ayacucho: Peruvian forces defeat the Spanish.
 December 23 – Chief Pushmataha of the Choctaw Nation dies in Washington.
 December 24 – The first American fraternity, Chi Phi (ΧΦ), is founded at Princeton University.
 December 28 – The Bathurst War comes to an end, with the defeat of the Wiradjuri.

Date unknown 
 The Egyptians capture Crete.
 The Dutch sign the Masang Agreement, temporarily ending hostilities in the Padri War.
 The name Australia, recommended by Matthew Flinders in 1804, is finally adopted as the official name of the country once known as New Holland.
 The Fort Vancouver trading post is established on the lower Columbia River by the Hudson's Bay Company.
 The Panoramagram is invented as the first stereoscopic viewer.
 The Colorado potato beetle is first described, by Thomas Say.

Births

January–June 

 January 7 – Julia Kavanagh, Irish novelist (d. 1877)
 January 8 – Wilkie Collins, British novelist (d. 1889)
 January 15 – Marie Duplessis, French courtesan (d. 1847)
 January 21 – Thomas Jonathan "Stonewall" Jackson, American Confederate general (d. 1863)
 January 26 – Emil Czyrniański, Polish chemist (d. 1888)
 February 7 – Sir William Huggins, British astronomer (d. 1910)
 February 8 – Barnard Elliott Bee, Jr., American Confederate general (d. 1861)
 February 12 – Dayananda Saraswati, Hindu religious leader, Vedic scholar who founded the reform movement Arya Samaj (d. 1883)
 February 14 – Winfield Scott Hancock, American Civil War Union general, Democratic presidential candidate (d. 1886)
 February 27 – Prince Kuni Asahiko of Japan (d. 1891)
 March 2 – Bedřich Smetana, Czech composer (d. 1884)
 March 9 –  Amasa Leland Stanford, American tycoon, industrialist and politician, 8th Governor of California (d. 1893)
 March 12 – Gustav Kirchhoff, German physicist (d. 1887)
 March 19 – William Allingham, Irish author (d. 1889)
 March 22 – Charles Pfizer, German-American chemist, co-founder of Pfizer (d. 1906)
 March 25 – Clinton L. Merriam, American politician (d. 1900)
 March 26 – Julie-Victoire Daubié, French journalist (d. 1874)
 March 27 – Johann Wilhelm Hittorf, German physicist (d. 1914)
 April 6 – George Waterhouse, 7th Prime Minister of New Zealand (d. 1906)
 April 13 – William Alexander, Anglican bishop, Primate of All Ireland (d. 1911)
 May 6 – Tokugawa Iesada, 13th shōgun of Tokugawa shogunate of Japan (d. 1858)
 May 9 – Jacob ben Moses Bachrach, noted Polish-born apologist of Rabbinic Judaism (d. 1896)
 May 23 – Ambrose Burnside, American Civil War general, inventor, politician from Rhode Island (d. 1881)
 June 7 – Bernhard von Gudden, German neuroanatomist, psychiatrist (d. 1886) 
 June 8 – Arthur von Mohrenheim, Russian diplomat (d. 1906)
 June 20 – George Edmund Street, British architect (d. 1881)
 June 26 – William Thomson, 1st Baron Kelvin, Irish-born physicist, engineer (d. 1907)
 June 27 – Ednah Dow Littlehale Cheney, American writer, reformer, philanthropist (d. 1904)
 June 28 – Paul Broca, French physician, anthropologist (d. 1880)

July–December 

 July 1 – Casto Méndez Núñez, Spanish admiral (d. 1869)
 July 12 – Eugène Boudin, French painter (d. 1898)
 July 21 – Stanley Matthews, American politician, Associate Justice of the Supreme Court of the United States (d. 1889)
 July 27 – Alexandre Dumas, fils, French writer (d. 1895)
 August 3 – William Burnham Woods, Associate Justice of the Supreme Court of the United States (d. 1887)
 August 7 – Gideon T. Stewart, American temperance movement leader (d. 1907)
 September 4
 Anton Bruckner, Austrian composer (d. 1896)
 Phoebe Cary, American poet, sister to Alice Cary (1820–1871) (d. 1871)
 September 27 – Benjamin Apthorp Gould, American astronomer (d. 1896)
 October 2 – Henry C. Lord, American railroad executive (d. 1884)
 October 5 – Henry Chadwick, English-born American baseball writer, historian (d. 1908)
 October 18 – Juan Valera y Alcalá-Galiano, Spanish author (d. 1905)
 October 26 – Edward Cooper, 83rd Mayor of New York City (d. 1905)
 October 27 – Edward Maitland, British writer (d. 1897)
 November 24 – Frederick Miller, German-born American brewer, businessman (d. 1888)
 December 10 – George MacDonald, Scottish writer (d. 1905)
 December 11 – Jonathan Letterman, American surgeon, "Father of Battlefield Medicine" (d. 1872)
 December 14 – Pierre Puvis de Chavannes, French painter (d. 1898)
 December 18 – Sir John Hall, 12th Prime Minister of New Zealand (d. 1907)
 December 27 – Charlotta Norberg, Swedish ballerina (d. 1892)

Deaths

January–June 

 January 21 – Jean-Baptiste Drouet, French revolutionary (b. 1765)
 January 26 – Théodore Géricault, French painter (b. 1791)
 January 29 – Princess Louise of Stolberg-Gedern, wife of Charles Edward Stuart (b. 1752)
 February 9 – Anne Catherine Emmerich, German Augustinian Canoness, mystic, Marian visionary, ecstatic and stigmatist (b. 1774)
 February 21 – Eugène de Beauharnais, son of Joséphine de Beauharnais (b. 1781)
 April 3 – Sally Seymour, American pastry chef and restaurateur
 April 19 – George Gordon Byron, 6th Baron Byron, English poet (b. 1788)
 May 15 – Johann Philipp Stadion, Count von Warthausen, German statesman (b. 1763)
 May 26 – Capel Lofft, English writer (b. 1751)
 May 29 – Jean-Baptiste Willermoz, French Freemason (b. 1730)
 June 16 – Charles-François Lebrun, duc de Plaisance, Third Consul of France (b. 1739)
 June 18 – Ferdinand III, Grand Duke of Tuscany (b. 1769)
 June 21 – Étienne Aignan, French writer (b. 1773)

July–December 

 July 14 – Kamehameha II, King of Hawaii (b. 1797)
 July 19 – Agustín de Iturbide, Emperor of Mexico (b. 1783)
 July 20 – Maine de Biran, French philosopher (b. 1766)
 July 21 – Buddha Loetla Nabhalai (Rama II), King of Siam (Thailand) (b. 1767)
 August 12 – Charles Nerinckx, Belgian-born founder of the Sisters of Loretto (b. 1761)
 August 24 – Valentine Quin, 1st Earl of Dunraven and Mount-Earl, Irish politician (b. 1752)
 September 16 – King Louis XVIII of France (b. 1755)
 October 13 – Sir James Lamb, 1st Baronet of England (b. 1752)
 October 30 – Charles Maturin, Irish writer (b. 1773)
 December 5 – Anne Louise Boyvin d'Hardancourt Brillon de Jouy, French confidant of Benjamin Franklin (b. 1744)
 December 21 – James Parkinson, English surgeon, apothecary, geologist, palaeontologist, and political activist (b. 1755)

References 

 
Leap years in the Gregorian calendar